Chris Cournoyer is the Iowa State Senator from the 35th District. A Republican, she has served in the Iowa Senate since 2019. She currently resides in Le Claire, Iowa.

Chris Cournoyer formerly served as the President of the Pleasant Valley Community School District School Board.

As of February 2020, Cournoyer serves on the following committees: Education (Vice Chair), Natural Resources and Environment, State Government, and Transportation. She also serves on the Economic Development Appropriations Subcommittee, as well as the Early Childhood Iowa State Board, and the Research and Development School Advisory Council.

Electoral history

Notes 

University of Texas alumni
Republican Party Iowa state senators
Living people
21st-century American politicians
Women state legislators in Iowa
Year of birth missing (living people)
School board members in Iowa
21st-century American women politicians